Donald Johnson and Jared Palmer were the defending champions but lost in the semifinals to Bob Bryan and Mike Bryan.

The Bryans won in the final 7–5, 7–6(8–6) against Mark Knowles and Daniel Nestor.

Seeds

  Donald Johnson /  Jared Palmer (semifinals)
  Mark Knowles /  Daniel Nestor (final)
  Ellis Ferreira /  Rick Leach (quarterfinals)
  Joshua Eagle /  Sandon Stolle (first round)

Draw

External links
 Doubles draw

Tennis Channel Open
2002 ATP Tour
2002 Tennis Channel Open